Bijoy Krishna Handique (12 October 1934 – 26 July 2015) was an Indian politician who was a member of the 15th Lok Sabha of India. He represented the Jorhat constituency of Assam and was a member of the Indian National Congress (INC) political party.  He was the only son of Krishna Kanta Handique, a renowned Indologist. Handique was a senior Member of Parliament from the North Eastern Region and represented the Jorhat Lok Sabha, Assam for six consecutive terms since 1991 to 2009. He also served as a Rajya Sabha member from 1980 to 1986. He had been elected to the Assam State Assembly in 1972 from the Jorhat constituency.

Biography

Early life and education

Handique studied English literature at Presidency College, Calcutta (now Kolkata). He went on to complete M.A. in English from the University of Calcutta.

He attended Jorhat Govt. Boys' H.S and M.P. School in his formative years.

In Class VII, he joined the local Students' Congress, during India's freedom movement. There, he mobilised other students in a 'Vote for Congress' campaign, before the Assam provincial elections of 1945. He organised literary circles for talks around freedom. This was much against the wishes of his father, who then wanted him to pursue a career in academics.

He became a member of Youth Congress formally in 1961.

1962: School

In the early 1960s, Handique became concerned about the lack of an English medium school in the vast Upper Assam area. This led him to eventually establish the Hemlata Handiqui Memorial Institute [HHMI], the first English medium school in Upper Assam, in 1962. This eventually developed HHMI, which encouraged students to take up subjects as diverse as workshops on music and Shakespeare.

The task was not without its hiccups, though land for the school was purchased by Handique's family. Within months of the school starting its first classes, the Indo-China war of 1962 broke out. This created panic in Jorhat, and many teachers and students fled from the town. He assisted the Red Cross in their efforts at training and organisation.
Handique donated his mother's jewellery to the war effort.

"Many people fled following the Chinese aggression and the fall of Tawang and Bomdila in the northeastern sector. There was great panic. Our first principal, J S Walters, went missing. He left without notice, taking only his bicycle with him. Due to fears of a full scale war, the school was closed for a month."

In 2012, the school celebrated its 50th anniversary. Handique composed a song for the occasion, set to tune by a former student.

1970s: Assam State Assembly

1980-1985: Rajya Sabha
Handique was a member of:
 Consultative Committee, Ministry of Education & Sports Affairs (1980–90) 
 Committee of Privileges (1984–85) 
 Committee on Welfare of Scheduled Castes and Scheduled Tribes (1982–84)

After 1986, he stayed on the Consultative Committee, Ministry of Education & Sports Affairs until 1990.

1991-1996: 10th Lok Sabha
Handique was a member of:
 Committee on Industry (1991-1996)
 Committee on Food & Supplies (1991-1996) 
 Committee on Official Language (1991-1996) 
 Consultative Committee, Ministry of Petroleum (1991-1996)

1996-1999: 11th and 12th Lok Sabha
Handique was a member of:
 Committee on Industry (1998-1999) 
 Consultative Committee, Ministry of External Affairs (1997-1999)
 Chairman, Railway Convention Committee, (1998-1999)

Position on AFSPA: The Armed Forces (Special Powers) Act, 1958
Handique has been critical of the controversial Armed Forces (Special Powers) Act (AFSPA) and has given his views on the floor of Parliament. The Act gives the Indian Army immunity to arrest without warrant on suspicion, shoot and kill any citizen in areas deemed disturbed by the government, without any recourse to scrutiny. AFPSA is currently implemented in certain parts of Northeast India and Kashmir.

In July 1998 at the Lok Sabha debates, he said, "The Armed Forces operating in the insurgency-prone Northeast, was never examined to assess that this could degenerate into a Draconian piece of legislation… an Army officer armed with such power to kill, an immunity under the Act, is naturally instigated to invoke such powers right from the word 'go' in a confrontation... If fighting terrorism is a state of mind, then causing deaths, while tackling the terrorists, is also likely to be registered on an Army personnel's state of mind. So it's full of paradox. Government deploys the Army to fight the terrorists for the protection of its citizens, but it's the common men and women who are caught in the crossfire and suffer the most... I understand the feelings where brutal operations were conducted under the Armed Forces Act. It's true that the scars on the soul cannot be bartered away with economic packages".

1999-2004: 13th Lok Sabha
Handique was a member of:
 Lok Sabha Rules Committee (1999-2004) 
 Consultative Committee, Ministry of External Affairs (1999-2004)
 Committee on Petroleum and Chemicals (1999-2000)

2004-2009: 14th Lok Sabha, Minister of State
Handique held the following positions:
 Union Minister of State, Chemicals & Fertilizers, 2006 –2009
 Union Minister of State, Parliamentary Affairs, 2004-2007
 Union Minister of State, Defence, 2004 –2006

Before he took ministerial responsibilities in 2004, Handique frequently spoke on Parliamentary processes and procedures to Central government probationary officers including Indian Administrative Services (IAS) officers. These lectures were organised by the Bureau of Parliamentary Studies and Training.

As Minister of State and Cabinet Minister for seven years in the 14th and part of 15th Lok Sabha (between June 2004 and July 2011), Handique participated in debates on behalf of the government. Only starred questions and replies have been included in the three volumes for economy of space. Under Parliamentary proceedings, ministers do not ask questions, but reply to questions of Members. They also do not introduce private member bills.

They include debates on Assam Appropriation Bill, Assam State legislature (Delegation of Powers) Bill, 1981, Floods in Assam, Chaparmukh-Silghat Railway line Bill, Illegal Migrants (Determination by Tribunals) Bill, Tea (Amendment) Bill, Gangtok Municipal Corporation (Amendment) Bill, among others.

Bills of national importance include Wildlife (Protection) Amendment Bill, The Representation of the People (Amendment) Bill, 1985, Handloom Bill, The Copyrights (Amendment) Bill, National Health Policy, General Budgets and Finance Bills, among others.

"Scope of a Minister as a Parliamentarian, is of course different from that of a Member of Parliament. How I speak as an M.P. from the Treasury Benches, as a Member in Opposition and as a member of the Council of Ministers follow conventionally different patterns", Handique writes in his foreword to A Life in Parliament.

2009-2014: 15th Lok Sabha, Cabinet Minister

Minister of Mines
He was the Minister of Mines from May 2009 to 18 January 2011, Minister of Development of North Eastern Region from May 2009 to July 2011 and Minister of State, Defence & Parliamentary Affairs, Mines & Chemicals and Fertilizers between 2004 and 2009.

In the 15th Lok Sabha elections, Handique won from the Jorhat constituency for the sixth consecutive term and was promoted to Union Cabinet minister status. He formally took the oath of office as Union Cabinet Minister holding dual charges of Mines and the Development of North East Region (DoNER) portfolios.

Handique was appointed a Minister of State for Defence and Parliamentary Affairs in 2004, and then was a Minister of State for Chemicals & Fertilizers and Mines up to 2009. It was during his tenure as Union Cabinet Minister of Mines from May 2009 to January 2011 that a new direction was given to the Nation's Mining Policy with the clause for participation and inclusion of local communities in mining belts including tribal areas. The Draft mining bill initiated by Handique was due for introduction in the Indian Parliament.

Handique proposed that 26% of equity or profits from the mining operations of a company should go to the people directly affected by the mining operations. In the present policy climate of promoting private profits at public cost, this came as refreshingly and an almost revolutionary suggestion. He proposed that this was the only way to give the local tribal populations in mining areas a stake in their operations.

The government was concerned about the large-scale resistance and unrest faced all over the country in response to its forced land acquisition policies. The Maoist insurgency, described as the biggest threat to Indian democracy by India's 'scholarly' PM Manmohan Singh, is active precisely, where all the prime & easily accessible – read most profitable – mineral deposits were located.

Handique proposed to make locals –project affected people [PAP]- the stakeholders in the project, and thus remove major impediment in expansion of old or development of new mines. His initiative had blessings, or so it looked, from the highest power centre in Congress Party, its president herself: "The new legislation is being framed amid UPA chief Sonia Gandhi voicing concerns over land acquisition norms and favouring the Haryana model – where farmers are provided lucrative compensation in addition to annuity for 33 years."

During his tenure, Handique came under terrific pressure to sell off the government's stakes in profitable mining companies like Coal India Ltd and Hindustan Copper Ltd, to private players. Despite that, he reasoned that since it was difficult to value these companies and because the benefits of privatisation were not obvious, the government would not sell its stake. To date, this remains the government's position.

He also blocked the privatisation-by-stealth strategy of mining companies like Vedanta Resources. These companies would form joint ventures with state owned mining companies to appropriate the profits from operations.

Handique also tried to deal with the problem of illegal mining in places like Bellary. He initiated the probes and investigations that eventually led to the arrest of G Janardhana Reddy and his brothers, illegal miners and the richest politicians of Karnataka in September, 2011.

During his tenure, global iron ore prices were ruling high, and extraordinary amount of ore, much of it mined illegally, was being exported. Handique proposed a windfall tax on ore exported to raise resources for the people adversely affected by projects.

Despite his proposal for a windfall tax, Handique was not in favour of banning mining activities in any state. He requested chief ministers of all mining states to cooperate with the government's efforts to clean up mining and ensure proper revenue collection.

Minister of Development of the North Eastern Region

During his tenure as Minister of Development of North Eastern Region, he initiated many major policy changes regarding connectivity, promotion of youth and industry in the Region. His amiable style of functioning had endeared him to the populace of the right North Eastern States. His acceptability was backed by his thorough understanding of the Region. Integration of the Region to the Mainstream was the central focus which he was successfully pursuing as the Minister of DoNER.

Post-Cabinet Minister activities

After tendering his resignation as Cabinet Minister, Handique was appointed chairman of the newly constituted parliamentary Standing Committee for Welfare of Other Backward Classes.

After 2012, he was a member of the Indian National Congress' Central Election Committee. The 14-member panel, chaired by Congress president Sonia Gandhi, is entrusted with the task of selecting party candidates for state and national elections.

Controversies

Parliamentary participation
In February 2014, before the Lok Sabha elections, some sections of Assamese media carried scurrilous reports suggesting that Handique had been an inactive member of Parliament, asking "Only one question in his 22 years in Parliament." Handique responded to this, pointing out that his Parliamentary interventions amounted to nearly 1,000 pages of printed matter, as collected in A Life in Parliament. The media was then forced to print his entire rebuttal, thereby admitting to their errors.

Personal life
Handique married Swarup Rani Borgohain in 1965. He had three married daughters and two grandchildren. In retirement, He was an occasional poet and whole time environmentalist. He was deeply interested in wildlife and conservation.

Death and funeral 
On 25 July 2015, Handique was admitted to Jorhat Medical College due to heart-related and respiratory ailments. In the afternoon of the same day, he was admitted to the ICU. On 26 July 2015, Handique died of a cardiact arrest, aged 80 at around 12:30 PM.

Many political figures paid tribute to him, including Sonia Gandhi, Rahul Gandhi, Tarun Gogoi, Sarat Barkotoky, Anjan Dutta, Ajanta Neog and many others. Sonia Gandhi said of Handique "he was a valued member of the previous UPA governments and the void created by his death will be hard to fill." The Assam government announced that Handique would be cremated with full state honours. Government offices and educational institutions of the district observed a half-holiday.

On 27 July Handique's body was taken to the Hemalata Handique Memorial Institute School and to the office of the Jorhat District Congress Committee. He was cremated with full state honours at the Tarajan cremation ground, with his daughter Maitreyee liting the funeral pyre at 6 PM amid a gun salute by Assam police personnel. Many political leaders, workers, representatives of various organisations and locals were present.

Awards and accolades
Handique was conferred the Venu Menon National Animal Award for Leadership in Conservation in the year 2006, for his key role in conservation of rare birds.

Books
Handique's debates, speeches & interventions as a Parliamentarian during the last 35 years (including one term in Rajya Sabha) have been recorded in three unedited volumes: 
 A Life in Parliament: Volume 1 (Rajya Sabha 1980-1986)
 A Life in Parliament: Volume II (Lok Sabha 1991-2004) 
 A Life in Parliament: Volume III (Lok Sabha and Rajya Sabha 2004-2014)

The three volumes, which run into nearly 1,000 pages, contain debates on a wide range of topics related to Assam, the Northeast and the nation.

References

External links
 
 
 

1934 births
2015 deaths
India MPs 1991–1996
India MPs 1996–1997
India MPs 1998–1999
India MPs 1999–2004
India MPs 2004–2009
India MPs 2009–2014
Indian National Congress politicians
Lok Sabha members from Assam
Members of the Assam Legislative Assembly
Members of the Cabinet of India
Mining ministers of India
People from Jorhat district
University of Calcutta alumni
United Progressive Alliance candidates in the 2014 Indian general election
Occasional poets